Pericardial can refer to:

 Pericardial sinus
 Pericardium
 Pericardial effusion